France's women's national field hockey team represents France in women's international field hockey and is controlled by the French Hockey Federation.

Tournament record

Summer Olympics
 2024 – Qualified

World Cup
 1974 – 7th place
 1976 – 6th place
 1981 – 9th place

European championships

EuroHockey Championship
 1984 – 10th place
 1987 – 10th place
 1991 – 10th place
 1995 – 7th place
 1999 – 10th place
 2003 – 8th place
 2005 – 8th place

EuroHockey Championship II
 2007 – 5th place
 2009 – 4th place
 2011 – 4th place
 2013 – 4th place
 2015 – 6th place
 2017 – 8th place
 2021 –

EuroHockey Championship III
 2019 –

Hockey World League
 2012–13 – Round 1
 2014–15 – 20th place
 2016–17 – Round 1

FIH Hockey Series
2018–19 – Second round

See also
 France men's national field hockey team

References

national team
European women's national field hockey teams
field hockey